John William Linden Gillespie (May 1862 – June 24, 1926) was a Major League Baseball outfielder. In that game, he had three at bats without a hit, and made three errors in four fielding chances.

Sources

Major League Baseball right fielders
Buffalo Bisons (PL) players
Baseball players from Buffalo, New York
1862 births
1926 deaths
19th-century baseball players